Radio Shalom can refer to multiple radio stations:

 Radio Shalom Copenhagen - Denmark
 Radio Shalom Dijon - France
 Radio Shalom Paris - France
 Radio Shalom Sweden - Sweden
 CJRS (Radio Shalom Montreal) - Canada (2001-2016)
 Radio Shalom (Liberia) - Liberia